Albert George Day (20 September 1865 – 16 October 1908) was an English first-class cricketer, who played six matches for Yorkshire County Cricket Club between 1885 and 1888.

Born in Dewsbury, Yorkshire, England, Day was a right-handed batsman, who scored 78 runs at an average of 7.80, with a best of 25 against Cambridge University, one of three matches he played in against that side. He also appeared against a touring Australian XI. He did not bowl in first-class cricket.  He also appeared in two non first-class matches against Scotland in 1888, scoring only 1 and 0. However, he was highly regarded by Dewsbury and Savile Cricket Club with whom he was connected.

Day died in Dewsbury in October 1908.

References

External links
Cricinfo Profile

1865 births
1908 deaths
Yorkshire cricketers
Cricketers from Dewsbury
English cricketers
English cricketers of 1864 to 1889